Expresso Tiradentes is the bus rapid transit (BRT) system in São Paulo, Brazil.  It is a mid-capacity transportation system that began construction in mid- 1997, under the name of Fura-Fila.  During the administration of Mayor Marta Suplicy, in mid- 2001, the name was changed to Paulistão.  
The current goal of the system is to connect the neighborhood of Sacomã to Parque Dom Pedro II, in order to integrate with other forms of transportation for the residents of the extreme eastern part of the city, mainly Cidade Tiradentes. 
The stretch between Sacomã and Parque Dom Pedro II and the words Vila Prudente - Parque Dom Pedro II . 
On April 28, 2009, Mayor Gilberto Kassab and Governor José Serra announced an agreement to amend the project, now to be called Metrô Leve Expresso Tiradentes.  The project cost is estimated at R$2.3 billion and is estimated to be completed (between Vila Prudente and Tiradentes ) in 2012.
For almost ten years, the BRT project of São Paulo has been postponed, and as a result, its original design has changed so that the current Expresso Tiradentes has lost virtually all the characteristics of a true BRT.  An agreement between the Mayor of São Paulo and the Governor declared that the stretch between Vila Prudente and Tiradentes would be a monorail system.

References

SPTrans
Bus rapid transit in São Paulo (state)
Year of establishment missing